Beaumont is an unincorporated community in Powhatan County, in the U.S. state of Virginia.  Beaumont has its own postal zip code, 23014.  The Beaumont Correctional Center is now an adult residential facility operated by the Virginia Department of Corrections in the Central Region. Google Maps incorrectly places the facility at the James River Detention Center and after a year of suggested edits will not change the location.

References

Unincorporated communities in Virginia
Unincorporated communities in Powhatan County, Virginia